Sarraltroff is a commune in the Moselle department in Grand Est in north-eastern France.

Geography 
Sarraltroff is located near the border with the Bas-Rhin department.

The territory of the municipality borders on those of 6 municipalities : Gœrlingen, Hilbesheim, Sarrebourg, Dolving, Oberstinzel et Hellering-lès-Fénétrange.

History 
At the time of the Duchy of Lorraine, the village was part of the seigneury of Sarreck. It belonged to a large, forgotten  area named Westrich, which Albert Eiselé called "ghost country" because its name has been forgotten.

In 1225 Gertrude de Dabo died without an heir. The bishoprics of Metz and Strasbourg took back their fief and Sarreck then became the property of La Petite-Pierre and then the Lutzelbourgs.

The Thirty Years War did not spare Sarraltroff. It is probably the troops of Bernard of Saxe-Weimar who destroyed the village after the siege of Sarrebourg.

See also
 Communes of the Moselle department

References

External links
 

Communes of Moselle (department)